There are numerous public and private polytechnic colleges in the Indian state of Kerala.

 Model Residential Polytechnic College, Kuzhalmannam, Palakkad
 Kerala Government Polytechnic College, Westhill P.O, Kozhikode
 Government Polytechnic College, Nattakom P.O., Kottayam, 686013
 Central Polytechnic, Vattiyoorkavu P.O, Thiruvananthapuram, 695013
 Maharaja's Technological Institute, Chembukavu, Thrissur 680020
 AWH Polytechnic College, Kuttikkattoor, Kozhikode
 Carmel Polytechnic, Punnapra P.O., Alappuzha, 688004
 Government Polytechnic, Angadippuram, Perinthalmanna, 679321
 Government Polytechnic, Attingal, 695101
 Government Polytechnic, Ezhukone, Kollam
 Government Polytechnic, Kalamassery, 683104
 Government Polytechnic, Koovappady P.O., Perumbavoor, Ernakulam
 Government Polytechnic, Koratty
 Government Polytechnic, Kotambu P.O., Palakkad, 678551
 Government Polytechnic, Kothamangalam, Chelad P.O., 686681, Ernakulam
 Government Polytechnic, Kumily
 Government Polytechnic, Kunnamkulam, Kizhoor P.O., Trichur, 680523
Government Polytechnic College, Karuvambram P.O,  Manjeri, Kerala 676517
 Government Polytechnic, Manakala P.O., Adoor, Pathanamthitta, 691523
 Government Polytechnic, Marothrvattom P.O., Cherthala, Alappuzha, 688545
 Government Polytechnic, Mattannur, Kannur, 670 702
 Government Polytechnic, Meppadi, Wayanad, 673577
 Government Polytechnic, Meenangadi, Wayanad, 673591
 Government Polytechnic, Muttom P.O., Thodupuzha, Idukkim, 685587
 Government Polytechnic, Nedumangad
 Government Polytechnic, Nedumkandam
 Government Polytechnic, P.O. Periye, Kasaragod, 671316
 Government Polytechnic College, Pala, Kottayam Dist., 686575
 Government Polytechnic, Punalur
 Government Polytechnic, Perumpazhuthoor, Thiruvananthapuram
 Government Polytechnic, Purappuzha P.O., Thodupuzha, Idukki, 685583
 Government Polytechnic, Thottada
 Government Polytechnic, Thrikaripur
 Government Polytechnic, Vennikulam, Pathanamthitta, 589544
 Government Polytechnic College, Chelakkara, Thrissur
 Government Polytechnic College, Thirurangadi, Velimukku P.O., Malappuram, 676317
 Government Women's Polytechnic, Kaimonom, Thiruvananthapuram
 Orphanage Polytechnic College, Edavanna
 Institute of Printing Technology & Government Polytechnic College, Kulappully, Shoranur, 679122, Palakkad
 J.D.T Islam Polytechnic, P.B. No. 1702, Marikkunnu, Kozhikode, 673012
 KELTRON TOOLROOM RESEARCH AND TRAINING CENTRE,Keltron complex, Keltron road,Aroor,Alappuzha-688534
 KMCT Polytechnic College, Kalananthode Chanthamangalam, Kozhikode
 Ma'din Polytechnic College, Melmuri, Malappuram
 Model Polytechnic, Kallettumkara P.O., Thrissur, 680683
 Model Polytechnic, Mattakkara, P.O Kottayam, 686564
 Model Polytechnic, Nut Street, Vatakara, 673104, Kozhikode
 Model Polytechnic, Painavu, Idukki District
 N.S.S. Polytechnic, Mannamnagar P.O., Pandalam, 689501
 Residential Women's Polytechnic, Payyanur, Kannur, 670307
 S.N.Polytechnic, Kanhangad, Kasaragod, 671315
 Seethi Sahib Memorial Polytechnic, P.B. No.1, P.O Thekkummuri, Tirur, 676105
 S.N.Polytechnic, Kottiyam, Kollam, 691 571
 Sree Rama Polytechnic, Valapad, Thrissur, 680567
 St. Mary's Polytechnic College, Valliyode, Palakkad
 Thiagarajar Polytechnic College, Alagappanagar P.O., 680302, Thrissur
 Women's Polytechnic, Ernakulam, Kalamassery P.O.
 Women's Polytechnic, Kayamkulam
 Women's Polytechnic, Kottakkal, P.O. Valavannur, Malappuram
 Women's Polytechnic, Kozhikode, 673009
 Women's Polytechnic, Nedupuzha P.O., Thrissur, 680015

See also
Bureau of Technical Education
Department of Technical Education, Kerala
List of institutions of higher education in Kerala

References

External links
 Kerala polytechnic colleges
 Polytechnic colleges in Kerala 2014-15

Polytechnic Colleges